Dobian is an administrative unit, known as a union council of Swabi District in the Khyber Pakhtunkhwa province of Pakistan.

Dobian is located in tehsil Razar of district Swabi.

District Swabi has four tehsils: Swabi Tehsil, Lahor, Topi Tehsil and Razar. Each  comprises a certain number of union councils. There are 56 union councils in district Swabi. Its postal code is 23330.

External links
Khyber-Pakhtunkhwa Government website section on Lower Dir
United Nations
 HAJJ website Uploads
PBS paiman.jsi.com 
postal code of Dobian
postal code for Dobian

Populated places in Swabi District
Union councils of Khyber Pakhtunkhwa
Union Councils of Swabi District